Castelletto sopra Ticino, also referred to by locals as Castelletto Ticino or just Castelletto, is a comune (municipality) in the Province of Novara in the Italian region of Piedmont, located about  northeast of Turin and about  north of Novara. Celtic inscriptions have been found.

It is the birthplace of the immunologist Serafino Belfanti. It is also where singer Billy More is buried.

References

Cities and towns in Piedmont
Populated places on Lake Maggiore